Golda Rosheuvel (born 1 January 1970) is a Guyanese-British actress and singer. She is known for her theatre work and a number of on-screen roles, most prominently for the portrayal of Queen Charlotte in Netflix's Bridgerton.

Early life
Rosheuvel was born in Guyana to a Guyanese father and an English mother. She has a brother. She moved to England when she was five.

Career
Rosheuvel's stage credits including Porgy and Bess, Macbeth, The Winter's Tale, Romeo and Juliet, Angels in America, Bad Girls: The Musical, and Jesus Christ Superstar. In 2018, Rosheuvel played a lesbian version of Othello in Othello.

In 2019, Rosheuvel was cast as Queen Charlotte in the Netflix period drama Bridgerton produced by Shonda Rhimes. The series premiered on 25 December 2020 with positive reviews from critics.

Personal life
Her partner is writer Shireen Mula. She is Patron of An Tobar and Mull Theatre, a multi art form creative hub on the Hebridean island of Mull.

Filmography

Awards and nominations

References

External links
 

Living people
1970 births
21st-century English actresses
Actresses from London
English stage actresses
English television actresses
English lesbian actresses
Guyanese actresses
Guyanese emigrants to England
Guyanese people of English descent
LGBT Black British people
Guyanese LGBT people
English LGBT singers
Lesbian singers
20th-century English LGBT people
21st-century English LGBT people